Jan Nepomucen Lewicki (1795 — 1871)  was a Polish painter, participant of the Polish November Uprising (1830-1831).

References

1795 births
1871 deaths
Polish painters
November Uprising participants